Aero Trasporti Italiani S.p.A (ATI) was an Italian airline headquartered in Naples, Italy. It was founded on 16 December 1963 as a subsidiary of Alitalia to take over secondary domestic routes in southern Italy operated by another Alitalia subsidiary Società Aerea Mediterranea.

History
Alitalia was the major share holder with the 90% of the airline's capital and the remaining 10% held from the state holding company IRI.
The first company's President was General Giovanni Buonamico and Captain M. Mainetti was the General manager.

ATI started operations on 2 June 1964 from its headquarters and main hub at the Naples Capodichino airport with a pair of Fokker F27s aircraft, of which a total of 13 were delivered by 1969; the same year the first 4 Douglas DC-9-32s joined the fleet.

Initially, the company flew on the Trieste-Venice-Florence-Rome, Rome-Naples-Palermo-Trapani-Pantelleria, Palermo-Catania-Reggio Calabria-Naples-Rome and Rome-Grosseto-Milan routes. Characteristic of ATI in the years that followed were the east-west connections in southern Italy and the Adriatic route from Trieste to Brindisi with some stops. 

An agreement, which became operational on 15 June 1966, was signed with Kingdom of Libya Airlines in order to run domestic routes in Libya and weekly flight to Malta, Tunis and Cairo with 2 Fokker F27s on wet lease until 1969. 

In 1966 the Sardinia region was added to the system and the fleet reached 7 F27s aircraft and 300,000 passengers transported. In August 1967 ATI took over the management of the subsidiary Elivie from Alitalia, but had to cease its helicopter operations in 1971. The same year were delivered 10 DC-9-32 aircraft and ATI transported 1,800,000 passengers. In 1973 ATI received new 13 Douglas DC-9-32s.

In the 80s, ATI gradually replaced its 27 DC-9-32 with 38 McDonnell Douglas MD-82, the Fokker fleet was replaced by 10 regional aircraft ATR 42. In 1994, Alitalia took over its subsidiary ATI completely for economic reasons, although officially part of the Alitalia fleet, several MD-82s flew in the following years still in the ATI livery with the exception of the lettering and the blue colour, that was identical to the Alitalia logo. 

On 20 March 1981, was formed Aermediterranea as a joint-venture between Alitalia and ATI to replace the private airline Itavia on the Italian internal scene. Alitalia provided 55% of the capital and ATI the remaining 45%. After the revocation of the air operator's certificate of Itavia, the flight crew was transferred to Aermediterranea which was merged into ATI in March 1985. 

Aero Trasporti Italiani was incorporated definitely into Alitalia on 30 October 1994.

Fleet

Accidents and incidents
 
 : a Fokker F27, registered as I-ATIR, departed from Naples to Bari and crashed into a hill about 43 miles from Bari. All 27 people on board died.

See also
List of defunct airlines of Italy

References

External links

 ATI — Aero Trasporti Italiani at Airliners.net
 ATI — Aero Trasporti Italiani at JetPhotoes.net
 ATI -- Aircraft Registration Database lookup
 ATI -- New Airline Company start operation's march 2022 Database lookup

Italian companies established in 1963
Italian companies disestablished in 1994
Defunct airlines of Italy
Companies based in Naples
Airlines established in 1963
Airlines disestablished in 1994